Goodwell is a town in Texas County, Oklahoma, United States.  The population was 1,293 at the 2010 census.  Goodwell is home to Oklahoma Panhandle State University.

History 
In 1901, Goodwell was established as a switch along the Chicago and Rock Island Railroad.  The switch was named Goodwell because a "good well" was found there.  In 1903, Goodwell was established and celebrated its centennial in 2003.

In 1909, the Pan-Handle Agricultural Institute was established in Goodwell.  Its name was changed to Panhandle Agricultural and Mechanical College (PAMC) in 1921, then to Oklahoma Panhandle State College of Agriculture and Applied Science in 1967, then to its current name of Oklahoma Panhandle State University in 1974.

The No Man's Land Museum was established in 1932 as a project of the science department at Panhandle Agricultural and Mechanical College. In 1933, the No Man's Land Historical Society was established and took control of the museum.

Three Union Pacific employees on the two trains died. One survivor of the crash escaped injury by leaping from the train when he saw a crash was imminent.

Geography 

Climate
According to the Köppen Climate Classification system, Goodwell has a cold semi-arid climate, abbreviated "BSk" on climate maps.

Demographics 

As of the 2010 census Goodwell had a population of 1293.  The racial and ethnic composition of the population was 70.6% non-Hispanic white, 8.2% African American, 2.2% Native American, 0.2% Asian, 0.1% Hawaiian Native, 3.1% reporting two or more races and 17.5% Hispanic or Latino.

As of the census of 2000, there were 1,192 people, 407 households, and 221 families residing in the town. There were 478 housing units at an average density of 402.5 per square mile (155.1/km2). The racial makeup of the town was 87.84% White, 3.27% African American, 2.10% Native American, 0.92% Asian, 0.08% Pacific Islander, 4.53% from other races, and 1.26% from two or more races. 8.64% of the population were Hispanic or Latino of any race.

There were 407 households, out of which 30.0% had children under the age of 18 living with them, 42.8% were married couples living together, 8.4% had a female householder with no husband present, and 45.7% were non-families. 26.8% of all households were made up of individuals, and 2.9% had someone living alone who was 65 years of age or older. The average household size was 2.32 and the average family size was 2.93.

In the town, the population was spread out, with 17.5% under the age of 18, 46.1% from 18 to 24, 21.1% from 25 to 44, 11.7% from 45 to 64, and 3.6% who were 65 years of age or older. The median age was 22 years. For every 100 females, there were 114.4 males. For every 100 females age 18 and over, there were 120.4 males.

The median income for a household in the town was $29,583, and the median income for a family was $42,708. Males had a median income of $24,000 versus $20,750 for females. The per capita income for the town was $12,531. 26.6% of the population and 18.1% of families were below the poverty line. Out of the total population, 32.2% of those under the age of 18 and 6.8% of those 65 and older were living below the poverty line.

See also
 National Register of Historic Places listings in Texas County, Oklahoma
 Franklin Hall

References

External links
 Oklahoma Panhandle State University
 No Man's Land Museum
 Encyclopedia of Oklahoma History and Culture - Goodwell 

 
Towns in Oklahoma
Towns in Texas County, Oklahoma
Populated places established in 1901
Oklahoma Panhandle